John William McIntosh (August 19, 1870 – August 12, 1939) was a physician and political figure in British Columbia. He represented Vancouver City from 1916 to 1920 in the Legislative Assembly of British Columbia as a Liberal.

Biography 
He was born in Guelph, Ontario on August 19, 1870, and was educated at the University of Toronto. He married Helena Keith on September 2, 1902, and they had one daughter.

McIntosh practised on Manitoulin Island, also serving as coroner. Around 1906, he entered practice at Vancouver, British Columbia, specializing in internal medicine. He served overseas during World War I. McIntosh served as Medical Health Officer for New Westminster and then Vancouver. He died at his home in Burnaby at age 68, having retired within the last year or so.

References 

1870 births
1939 deaths
British Columbia Liberal Party MLAs
Canadian coroners
University of Toronto alumni